Peter Buck (December 19, 1930 – November 18, 2021) was an American physicist, restaurateur, and philanthropist. He co-founded the Subway fast-food restaurant chain.

Early life and education
Buck was born on December 19, 1930 to Ervin and Lillian Bernice "Molly" (Draper) Buck, who owned a farm in South Portland, Maine. He had a younger brother named David. He and his brother grew up and worked on his parents' farm. He graduated from South Portland High School in 1948. He graduated from Bowdoin College in Brunswick, Maine, in 1952. He then earned master's and doctoral degrees in physics at Columbia University.

Career
In 1957 Buck went to work for General Electric at the Knolls Atomic Power Laboratory in Schenectady, New York. There, he performed tests and calculations on atomic power plants being developed for U.S. Navy submarines and surface ships. In 1965 he joined United Nuclear, in White Plains, New York, calculating the power distribution and refueling requirements of nuclear power plants. He finished his engineering career at Nuclear Energy Services in Danbury, Connecticut.

Buck loaned partner and family friend Fred DeLuca $1,000 in 1965 and advised him to open a sandwich shop to help him pay for college at the University of Bridgeport in Bridgeport, Connecticut. They named the restaurant after Buck, calling it "Pete's Super Submarines". Together Buck and De Luca formed "Doctor's Associates" to oversee operations as the restaurant business expanded.  Though neither the first nor the second restaurants were financial successes, they continued to expand their operations. By 1973, they had 16 locations throughout Connecticut and, in 1974, they began franchising out the restaurants. They also introduced a new logo and changed the name of their operation from what was then "Pete's Subway" to "Subway Sandwiches".

Subway continued to grow over the ensuing years and by 2010 became the largest fast food chain worldwide, with 33,749 restaurants. In 2015, Buck was ranked No. 261 on the Forbes 400 list of wealthiest people, with an estimated net worth of $1.6 billion.

Philanthropy, honors, and awards
The Peter and Carmen Lucia Buck Foundation (PCLB) was formed in 1999 as a private family foundation to manage their family's philanthropy. The Internet Archive received support from PCLB.

Buck personally made major donations to the Smithsonian Institution, where he served as a trustee of the National Museum of Natural History, including the 23.10 carat Carmen Lúcia Ruby, given to the museum's gem collection. It is thought to be one of the finest Burmese rubies known. Curator Jeffrey Post called the gem “the most important addition to the collection in the 20 years that I’ve been here.”

In 2008, Bowdoin College awarded Buck an honorary Doctor of Humane Letters degree. He gave a grant to Bowdoin College in 2009 that completed its capital campaign. Consequently, the college's new fitness center bears his name.

In 2014 Buck gave $30 million to Danbury Hospital towards a new addition.

As of 2020, Buck was the seventh-largest landowner in the United States by acreage, according to landreport.com, acquiring land for the purpose of open space conservation.

Personal life
Buck married Haydee Piñero in 1955, whose father Jesús T. Piñero was the first native governor of Puerto Rico. They had three children together: Christopher, Kenneth and Cynthia (Kenneth and Cynthia predeceased him). The marriage ended in divorce. He later married Carmen Lúcia Passagem. They had a son together, William. They were married over 20 years when she died in 2003.

Buck had a lifelong interest in aviation. For many years he owned and piloted a glider and remained an active member and supporter of the Soaring Society of America and the Valley Soaring Club.

Buck was a long-time resident of Danbury, Connecticut. He died in Danbury on November 18, 2021, a month before his 91st birthday.

See also 

 Fred DeLuca

References

External links
 Subway history

1930 births
2021 deaths
Bowdoin College alumni
American restaurateurs
Subway (restaurant)
People from South Portland, Maine
Columbia Graduate School of Arts and Sciences alumni
People from Danbury, Connecticut
American billionaires
American philanthropists
American nuclear physicists